Sergey Gubarev (born 1978) is a Kazakhstani water polo player from Frunze. At the 2012 Summer Olympics, he competed for the Kazakhstan men's national water polo team in the men's event. He is 6 ft 0 inches tall.

References

Kazakhstani male water polo players
1978 births
Living people
Olympic water polo players of Kazakhstan
Water polo players at the 2012 Summer Olympics
Kazakhstani people of Russian descent
Kyrgyzstani people of Russian descent
Sportspeople from Bishkek
Asian Games medalists in water polo
Water polo players at the 2010 Asian Games
Water polo players at the 2014 Asian Games
Asian Games gold medalists for Kazakhstan
Medalists at the 2010 Asian Games
Medalists at the 2014 Asian Games
20th-century Kazakhstani people